Eleni Georgiou (born 19 December 1985) is a Greek former synchronized swimmer who competed in the 2004 Summer Olympics.

References

1985 births
Living people
Greek synchronized swimmers
Olympic synchronized swimmers of Greece
Synchronized swimmers at the 2004 Summer Olympics